The 2021 LTP Charleston Pro Tennis II was a professional women's tennis tournament played on outdoor clay courts. It was the sixth edition of the tournament which was part of the 2021 ITF Women's World Tennis Tour. It took place in Charleston, South Carolina, United States between 21 and 27 June 2021.

Singles main-draw entrants

Seeds

 1 Rankings are as of 14 June 2021.

Other entrants
The following players received wildcards into the singles main draw:
  Elvina Kalieva
  Emma Navarro
  Taylor Ng
  Eleana Yu

The following player received entry using a protected ranking:
  Xu Shilin

The following player received entry as a special exempt:
  Peyton Stearns

The following players received entry from the qualifying draw:
  Charlotte Chavatipon
  Louisa Chirico
  Emma Davis
  Quinn Gleason
  Paige Hourigan
  Maria Sanchez
  Erika Sema
  Gergana Topalova

Champions

Singles

 Despina Papamichail def.  Gabriela Cé, 1–6, 6–3, 6–3

Doubles

  Fanny Stollár /  Aldila Sutjiadi def.  Rasheeda McAdoo /  Peyton Stearns, 6–0, 6–4

References

External links
 2021 LTP Charleston Pro Tennis II at ITFtennis.com
 Official website

2021 ITF Women's World Tennis Tour
2021 in American tennis
June 2021 sports events in the United States
2021 in sports in South Carolina
LTP Charleston Pro Tennis